The following highways are numbered 254:

Canada
 Manitoba Provincial Road 254
 Prince Edward Island Route 254

Costa Rica
 National Route 254

Ireland
 R254 regional road

Japan
 Japan National Route 254

United States
 Arkansas Highway 254
 California State Route 254 
 Connecticut Route 254
 Georgia State Route 254
 K-254 (Kansas highway)
Kentucky Route 254
 Maryland Route 254
 Minnesota State Highway 254
 Missouri Route 254
 Montana Secondary Highway 254
 New Mexico State Road 254
 New York State Route 254
 Ohio State Route 254
 Pennsylvania Route 254
 South Carolina Highway 254
 Tennessee State Route 254
 Texas State Highway 254
 Texas State Highway Loop 254
 Farm to Market Road 254 (Texas)
 Utah State Route 254 (former)
 Virginia State Route 254
 Wyoming Highway 254